Trenton–Robbinsville Airport  is a privately owned, public use airport a mile east of Robbinsville, in Mercer County, New Jersey, United States. The National Plan of Integrated Airport Systems for 2011–2015 categorized it as a general aviation reliever airport.

The airport is next to Miry Run Golf Course on Sharon Road just off Route 130. Trenton–Robbinsville Airport offers gas, lessons, rental planes, and hangars for private planes. Cutting Edge Aviation and Aviation Charters, at the west end of the field, offers full service aircraft maintenance.

The airport is improving safety issues. Work geared towards that goal started in October 2011 and was expected to finish in June 2012.

Facilities
Trenton–Robbinsville Airport covers 139 acres (56 ha) at an elevation of 118 feet (36 m). Its one runway, 11/29, is 4,275 by 75 feet (1,303 x 23 m).

In the year ending January 2, 2009 the airport had 19,615 general aviation aircraft operations, average 53 per day. 58 aircraft were then based at this airport: 93% single-engine, 5% multi-engine, and 2% helicopter.

Air Mods Flight Center operates a flight school at the airport.

See also 
 List of airports in New Jersey

References

External links 
 Trenton–Robbinsville Airport
 Trenton–Robbinsville Airport (N87) from New Jersey DOT Airport Directory
 

Airports in New Jersey
Transportation buildings and structures in Mercer County, New Jersey
Robbinsville Township, New Jersey